A Monster in Paris is a 2011 French 3D computer-animated musical comedy science fantasy adventure film directed by Bibo Bergeron, and based on a story he wrote. It was produced by Luc Besson, written by Bergeron and Stéphane Kazandjian, and distributed by EuropaCorp Distribution, and features the voices of Sean Lennon, Vanessa Paradis, Adam Goldberg, Danny Huston, Madeline Zima, Matthew Géczy, Jay Harrington, Catherine O'Hara and Bob Balaban. Many plot elements are drawn from Gaston Leroux's novel The Phantom of the Opera. It was released on 12 October 2011. It was also produced by Bibo Films, France 3 Cinéma, Walking The Dog, uFilm, uFund, Canal+, France Télévisions, CinéCinéma, Le Tax Shelter du Gouvernement Fédéral de Belgique and Umedia. Its music was composed by Matthieu Chedid, Sean Lennon and Patrice Renson.

Plot 
 

In 1910 Paris, shy projectionist Emile Petit travels with his friend Raoul to the Botanical Gardens to make a delivery. In the absence of the Professor who works there, the place is guarded by a proboscis monkey named Charles. Raoul experiments with two potions, one named "Atomize-a-Tune" and the other "Super Fertilizer." An explosion occurs after the two chemicals mix and Emile glimpses a monstrous creature  which escapes the laboratory. 

Meanwhile, Lucille, a cabaret singer at the club L'Oiseau Rare and Raoul's childhood friend, is pushed by her aunt Carlotta to marry wealthy Police Commissioner Victor Maynott. After numerous sightings of the creature, Maynott fronts an investigation launched by his second-in-command, Pâté. One night, Lucille encounters the creature and is at first terrified, but discovers it is actually an enlarged flea with a euphonious singing voice. Lucille dubs the creature "Francœur" and lets him live in her dressing room. 

Maynott learns of Emile and Raoul's involvement in the laboratory explosion,  but disregards it and awards them the Medal of Honor. They both get seats at Lucille's next show, where she and a disguised Francœur sing as a duet. After the show, Lucille accidentally reveals the identity of Francœur to Emile and Raoul. She plans to have  Francœur feign his death in a ceremony the following day.

The plan goes awry, and Maynott chases Francœur and his friends through the streets of Paris. The chase culminates in a battle at the Eiffel Tower; a gunshot from Maynott and Francœur's sudden disappearance lead everyone to believe that Francœur has been killed. Maynott is placed under arrest by Pâté on the basis that Francœur is innocent. Later that evening, Lucille discovers that Francœur is alive and has returned to his natural size. The Professor returns to the laboratory and restores Francœur to human size with a new mixture. Francœur takes second billing on posters advertising Lucille's show, while Lucille and Raoul become a couple after clearing up a misunderstanding from their childhood.

Cast

Music
The soundtrack includes both songs and short clips from the film, in both French and English. The soundtrack of the English version was released in the UK a few days after the film's release on both CD and digital download. The album is credited to Vanessa Paradis & (-M-)

French version
 "Les actualités (Interlude)" (0:27)
 "La valse de Paris" (0:43)
 "La Seine – Cabaret" (Vanessa Paradis -) (1:17)
 "Emile et Raoul" (2:00)
 "Sur les toits" (1:28)
 "Maynott" (1:05)
 "La rencontre" (1:45)
 "Un monstre à Paris" (-M-) (2:18)
 "Le baptëme" (Interlude) (Lucille) (0:11)
 "Francœur"/Lucille (2:13)
 "Brume à Paname" (1:01)
 "Cabaret" (1:02)
 "La Seine" (Vanessa Paradis & -M-) (2:48)
 "Perquisition" (0:59)
 "Sacré cœur" (0:56)
 "Papa Paname" (Vanessa Paradis) (2:23)
 "Sue le fleuve"/"Tournesol" (1:15)
 "Tour Eiffel infernale" (2:29)
 "L'amour dans l'âme" (-M-) (1:30)
 "Flashback" (1:39)
 "U p'tit baiser" (Vanessa Paradis & -M-) (2:24)
 "Funky baiser" (5:13)

English version
 "Interlude – the News" (0:27)
 "La Valse de Paris" (0:43)
 "La Seine and I Cabaret" (Vanessa Paradis -) (1:17)
 "Emile et Raoul" (2:00)
 "Sur les Toits" (1:28)
 "Maynott" (1:05)
 "La Rencontre" (1:45)
 "A Monster in Paris" (Sean Lennon) (2:18)
 "Interlude – Lucille 'The Baptism' (0:11)
 "Francœur – Lucille" (2:13)
 "Brume à Paname" (1:01)
 "Cabaret" (1:02)
 "La Seine and I" (Vanessa Paradis & Sean Lennon) (2:48)
 "Perquisition" (0:59)
 "Sacré Cœur" (0:56)
 "Papa Paris" (Vanessa Paradis) (2:23)
 "Sue le Fleuve – Tournesol" (1:15)
 "Tour Eiffel Infernale" (2:29)
 "Love is in My Soul" (Sean Lennon) (1:30)
 "Flashback" (1:39) 
 "Just a Little Kiss" (Vanessa Paradis & Sean Lennon) (2:24) 
 "Funky Baiser" (5:13)

Reception
The film received positive reviews from critics. On Rotten Tomatoes, it received an aggregate score of 87% based on 23 reviews (20 "fresh" and 3 "rotten").

Accolades
Annie Awards 2014
 Annie Award – Outstanding Achievement in Character Design in an Animated Feature Production – Christophe Lourdelet – Nominated
César Awards 2012
 César Award – Best Animated Film (Meilleur film d'animation) – Bibo Bergeron (director), Luc Besson (producer) – Nominated
 César Award – Best Original Music (Meilleure musique originale) – Matthieu Chedid, Patrice Renson – Nominated

References

External links
 

2011 films
2011 3D films
2011 comedy films
2011 computer-animated films
2010s French animated films
2011 fantasy films
2010s musical films
2010s monster movies
2010s English-language films
2010s French-language films
French 3D films
French computer-animated films
French children's films
French animated fantasy films
French fantasy comedy films
French musical comedy films
French romantic comedy films
French independent films
Animated romance films
Animated science fantasy films
3D animated films
English-language French films
Films based on The Phantom of the Opera
Films about shapeshifting
Animated films set in Paris
Films set in 1910
Films directed by Bibo Bergeron
Films produced by Luc Besson
2010s French films